Best of Live, alternatively known as Classic Hits Live,  is Foreigner's first live album. It was released in 1993, and contains live versions of many of their well-known songs all of which were taken from various concerts between 1977 and 1985. Ultimate Classic Rock named it as part of their "Most Awesome Live Albums from Every Rock Legend" list in 2019.

Track listing

Personnel
 Lou Gramm - percussion, lead vocals
 Mick Jones - guitar, piano, backing vocals
 Ed Gagliardi - bass, backing vocals
 Rick Wills - bass, backing vocals
 Ian McDonald - saxophone, keyboards, guitars, backing vocals
 Al Greenwood - keyboards, synthesizers
 Dennis Elliott - drums

References

External links

Foreigner (band) albums
1993 live albums
Atlantic Records live albums